Helmut Becker (8 March 1927 – 19 July 1990), German viticulturist, was chief of the Geisenheim Grape Breeding Institute. As a successor of Heinrich Birk, he viewed viticulture from a global perspective and promoted the globalization of a quality wine industry. Dr. Becker collaborated with numerous scientists around the world and encouraged the importation of important clones and varieties in New Zealand, Canada, Australia, Japan and other countries. He did early important work in Neustadt/Weinstrasse during the 1950s and 1960s in the European phylloxera eradication program.

Some of the grape varieties bred by Helmut Becker at the Research Institute Geisenheim :

See also
German wine
List of wine personalities

References

Further reading
Robinson, Jancis (Ed.) The Oxford Companion to Wine. Oxford: Oxford University Press, second edition, 1999.

1927 births
1990 deaths
German viticulturists
Recipients of the Cross of the Order of Merit of the Federal Republic of Germany
People from the Rheingau